Uglješa Ilić (born 4 August 1988) is a Serbian volleyball player. He is 201 cm tall, and he is playing as an opposite.

Clubs

References

External links 
 Profile on World of Volley

Serbian men's volleyball players
1988 births
Living people
People from Aranđelovac
Serbian expatriate sportspeople in Switzerland
Expatriate volleyball players in Switzerland
Serbian expatriate sportspeople in Romania
Expatriate volleyball players in Romania
Serbian expatriate sportspeople in Slovakia
Expatriate volleyball players in Slovakia